K. Sam-Ghartey was a Ghanaian diplomat. He served as Ghana's ambassador to Mali from 1967 to 1969. Due to dr. Kwame Nkrumah's relationship with the then president of Mali, Modibo Keïta, Ghana's relationship with Mali waned following the overthrow of Kwame Nkrumah. Ghana's representative in Mali, Ghartey-Sam consequently served as head of Chancery.

See also
Embassy of Ghana in Bamako

References

Year of birth missing
Ambassadors of Ghana to Mali